Vilner is a surname. Notable people with the surname include:

Liron Vilner (born 1979), Israeli footballer
Meir Vilner (1918–2003), Israeli politician
Yakov Vilner (1899–1931), Ukrainian chess player

Jewish surnames
Yiddish-language surnames